The Operator is a 2000 American film, starring Michael Laurence, Stephen Tobolowsky, Brion James, Brad Leland and Jacqueline Kim. It was written and directed by Jon Dichter.

Plot
A telephone operator resolves to takes revenge on a rude and impolite customer.

Cast
 Michael Laurence as Gary Wheelan
 Stephen Tobolowsky as Doc
 Brion James as Vernon Woods
 Brad Leland as Husband
 Jacqueline Kim as The Operator

Reception
On Metacritic it has a score 44 out of 100, indicating "mixed or average reviews". On Rotten Tomatoes it holds a 45% score.

References

External links
 
 The Operator at Moviefone
 The Operator at All Movie

2000 films
2000 thriller films
American thriller films
2000s English-language films
2000s American films